is a former Japanese football player.

Club statistics

References

External links

1985 births
Living people
Association football people from Fukuoka Prefecture
Japanese footballers
J2 League players
Hokkaido Consadole Sapporo players
Mito HollyHock players
Thespakusatsu Gunma players
Fukushima United FC players
Association football midfielders